Cervical cancer is a cancer arising from the cervix. It is due to the abnormal growth of cells that have the ability to invade or spread to other parts of the body. Early on, typically no symptoms are seen. Later symptoms may include abnormal vaginal bleeding, pelvic pain or pain during sexual intercourse. While bleeding after sex may not be serious, it may also indicate the presence of cervical cancer.

Human papillomavirus infection (HPV) causes more than 90% of cases; most  who have had HPV infections, however, do not develop cervical cancer. HPV 16 and 18 strains are responsible for nearly 50% of high grade cervical pre-cancers. Other risk factors include smoking, a weak immune system, birth control pills, starting sex at a young age, and having many sexual partners, but these are less important. Genetic factors also contribute to cervical cancer risk. Cervical cancer typically develops from precancerous changes over 10 to 20 years. About 90% of cervical cancer cases are squamous cell carcinomas, 10% are adenocarcinoma, and a small number are other types. Diagnosis is typically by cervical screening followed by a biopsy. Medical imaging is then done to determine whether or not the cancer has spread.

HPV vaccines protect against two to seven high-risk strains of this family of viruses and may prevent up to 90% of cervical cancers. As a risk of cancer still exists, guidelines recommend continuing regular Pap tests. Other methods of prevention include having few or no sexual partners and the use of condoms. Cervical cancer screening using the Pap test or acetic acid can identify precancerous changes, which when treated, can prevent the development of cancer. Treatment may consist of some combination of surgery, chemotherapy, and radiation therapy. Five-year survival rates in the United States are 68%. Outcomes, however, depend very much on how early the cancer is detected.

Worldwide, cervical cancer is both the fourth-most common type of cancer and the fourth-most common cause of death from cancer in women. In 2012, an estimated 528,000 cases of cervical cancer occurred, with 266,000 deaths. This is about 8% of the total cases and total deaths from cancer. About 70% of cervical cancers and 90% of deaths occur in developing countries. In low-income countries, it is one of the most common causes of cancer death. In developed countries, the widespread use of cervical screening programs has dramatically reduced rates of cervical cancer. Expected scenarios for the reduction of mortality due to cervical cancer worldwide (and specially in low-income countries) have been reviewed, given assumptions with respect to the achievement of recommended prevention targets using triple-intervention strategies defined by WHO. In medical research, the most famous immortalized cell line, known as HeLa, was developed from cervical cancer cells of a woman named Henrietta Lacks.

Signs and symptoms
The early stages of cervical cancer may be completely free of symptoms. Vaginal bleeding, contact bleeding (one most common form being bleeding after sexual intercourse), or (rarely) a vaginal mass may indicate the presence of malignancy. Also, moderate pain during sexual intercourse and vaginal discharge are symptoms of cervical cancer. In advanced disease, metastases may be present in the abdomen, lungs, or elsewhere.

Symptoms of advanced cervical cancer may include: loss of appetite, weight loss, fatigue, pelvic pain, back pain, leg pain, swollen legs, heavy vaginal bleeding, bone fractures, and (rarely) leakage of urine or feces from the vagina. Bleeding after douching or after a pelvic exam is a common symptom of cervical cancer.

Causes

Infection with some types of HPV is the greatest risk factor for cervical cancer, followed by smoking. HIV infection is also a risk factor. Not all of the causes of cervical cancer are known, however, and several other contributing factors have been implicated.

Human papillomavirus
HPV types 16 and 18 are the cause of 75% of cervical cancer cases globally, while 31 and 45 are the causes of another 10%.

People with a cervix who have multiple sexual partners, or have partners who have multiple sexual partners, regardless of sex are at higher risk of cervical cancer .

Of the 150-200 types of HPV known,  15 are classified as high-risk types (16, 18, 31, 33, 35, 39, 45, 51, 52, 56, 58, 59, 68, 73, and 82), three as probable high-risk (26, 53, and 66), and 12 as low-risk (6, 11, 40, 42, 43, 44, 54, 61, 70, 72, 81, and CP6108).

Genital warts, which are a form of benign tumor of epithelial cells, are also caused by various strains of HPV. However, these serotypes are usually not related to cervical cancer. Having multiple strains at the same time is common, including those that can cause cervical cancer along with those that cause warts. Infection with HPV is generally believed to be required for cervical cancer to occur.

Smoking 
Cigarette smoking, both active and passive, increases the risk of cervical cancer. Among HPV-infected women, current and former smokers have roughly two to three times the incidence of invasive cancer. Passive smoking is also associated with increased risk, but to a lesser extent.

Smoking has also been linked to the development of cervical cancer. Smoking can increase the risk in women a few different ways, which can be by direct and indirect methods of inducing cervical cancer. A direct way of contracting this cancer is a smoker has a higher chance of cervical intraepithelial neoplasia (CIN3) occurring, which has the potential of forming cervical cancer. When CIN3 lesions lead to cancer, most of them have the assistance of the HPV virus, but that is not always the case, which is why it can be considered a direct link to cervical cancer. Heavy smoking and long-term smoking seem to have more of a risk of getting the CIN3 lesions than lighter smoking or not smoking at all. Although smoking has been linked to cervical cancer, it aids in the development of HPV, which is the leading cause of this type of cancer. Also, not only does it aid in the development of HPV, but also if the woman is already HPV-positive, she is at an even greater likelihood of contracting cervical cancer.

Oral contraceptives
Long-term use of oral contraceptives is associated with increased risk of cervical cancer in women who have had HPV. Women who have used oral contraceptives for 5 to 9 years have about three times the incidence of invasive cancer, and those who used them for 10 years or longer have about four times the risk.

Multiple pregnancies
Having many pregnancies is associated with an increased risk of cervical cancer. Among HPV-infected women, those who have had seven or more full-term pregnancies have around four times the risk of cancer compared with women with no pregnancies, and two to three times the risk of women who have had one or two full-term pregnancies.

Diagnosis

Biopsy
The Pap test can be used as a screening test, but produces a false negative in up to 50% of cases of cervical cancer. Other concerns is the cost of doing Pap tests, which make them unaffordable in many areas of the world.

Confirmation of the diagnosis of cervical cancer or precancer requires a biopsy of the cervix. This is often done through colposcopy, a magnified visual inspection of the cervix aided by using a dilute acetic acid (e.g. vinegar) solution to highlight abnormal cells on the surface of the cervix, with visual contrast provided by staining the normal tissues a mahogany brown with Lugol's iodine. Medical devices used for biopsy of the cervix include punch forceps. Colposcopic impression, the estimate of disease severity based on the visual inspection, forms part of the diagnosis. Further diagnostic and treatment procedures are loop electrical excision procedure and cervical conization, in which the inner lining of the cervix is removed to be examined pathologically. These are carried out if the biopsy confirms severe cervical intraepithelial neoplasia.

Often before the biopsy, the doctor asks for medical imaging to rule out other causes of woman's symptoms. Imaging modalities such as ultrasound, CT scan, and MRI have been used to look for alternating disease, spread of the tumor, and effect on adjacent structures. Typically, they appear as heterogeneous mass on the cervix.

Interventions such as playing music during the procedure and viewing the procedure on a monitor can reduce the anxiety associated with the examination.

Precancerous lesions

Cervical intraepithelial neoplasia, the potential precursor to cervical cancer, is often diagnosed on examination of cervical biopsies by a pathologist.  For premalignant dysplastic changes, cervical intraepithelial neoplasia grading is used.

The naming and histologic classification of cervical carcinoma precursor lesions has changed many times over the 20th century.  The World Health Organization classification system was descriptive of the lesions, naming them mild, moderate, or severe dysplasia or carcinoma in situ (CIS).  The term cervical intraepithelial neoplasia (CIN) was developed to place emphasis on the spectrum of abnormality in these lesions, and to help standardize treatment.  It classifies mild dysplasia as CIN1, moderate dysplasia as CIN2, and severe dysplasia and CIS as CIN3.  More recently, CIN2 and CIN3 have been combined into CIN2/3.  These results are what a pathologist might report from a biopsy.

These should not be confused with the Bethesda system terms for Pap test (cytopathology) results.  Among the Bethesda results: Low-grade squamous intraepithelial lesion (LSIL) and high-grade squamous intraepithelial lesion (HSIL).  An LSIL Pap may correspond to CIN1, and HSIL may correspond to CIN2 and CIN3, but they are results of different tests, and the Pap test results need not match the histologic findings.

Cancer subtypes
Histologic subtypes of invasive cervical carcinoma include:
 Squamous cell carcinoma (about 80–85%)
 adenocarcinoma (about 15% of cervical cancers in the UK)
 Adenosquamous carcinoma
 Small cell carcinoma
 Neuroendocrine tumour
 Glassy cell carcinoma
 Villoglandular adenocarcinoma

Though squamous cell carcinoma is the cervical cancer with the most incidence, the incidence of adenocarcinoma of the cervix has been increasing in recent decades. Endocervical adenocarcinoma represents 20–25% of the histological types of cervical carcinoma. Gastric-type mucinous adenocarcinoma of the cervix is a rare type of cancer with aggressive behavior. This type of malignancy is not related to high-risk human papillomavirus (HPV).
Noncarcinoma malignancies which can rarely occur in the cervix include melanoma and lymphoma.  The International Federation of Gynecology and Obstetrics (FIGO) stage does not incorporate lymph node involvement in contrast to the TNM staging for most other cancers. For cases treated surgically, information obtained from the pathologist can be used in assigning a separate pathologic stage, but is not to replace the original clinical stage.

Staging

Cervical cancer is staged by the FIGO system, which is based on clinical examination rather than surgical findings. Prior to the 2018 revisions to FIGO staging, the system allowed only these diagnostic tests to be used in determining the stage: palpation, inspection, colposcopy, endocervical curettage, hysteroscopy, cystoscopy, proctoscopy, intravenous urography, and X-ray examination of the lungs and skeleton, and cervical conization. However, the current system allows use of any imaging or pathological methods for staging.

Prevention

Screening 

Checking cervical cells with the Papanicolaou test (Pap test) for cervical pre-cancer has dramatically reduced the number of cases of, and mortality from, cervical cancer. Liquid-based cytology may reduce the number of inadequate samples. Pap test screening every three to five years with appropriate follow-up can reduce cervical cancer incidence up to 80%. Abnormal results may suggest the presence of precancerous changes, allowing examination and possible preventive treatment, known as colposcopy. The treatment of low-grade lesions may adversely affect subsequent fertility and pregnancy. Personal invitations encouraging women to get screened are effective at increasing the likelihood they will do so. Educational materials also help increase the likelihood women will go for screening, but they are not as effective as invitations.

According to the 2010 European guidelines, the age at which to start screening ranges between 20 and 30 years of age, but preferentially not before age 25 or 30 years, and depends on burden of the disease in the population and the available resources.

In the United States, screening is recommended to begin at age 21, regardless of age at which a woman began having sex or other risk factors. Pap tests should be done every three years between the ages of 21 and 65. In women over the age of 65, screening may be discontinued if no abnormal screening results were seen within the previous 10 years and no history of CIN2 or higher exists. HPV vaccination status does not change screening rates.

A number of recommended options exist for screening those 30 to 65. This includes cervical cytology every 3 years, HPV testing every 5 years, or HPV testing together with cytology every 5 years. Screening is not beneficial before age 25, as the rate of disease is low. Screening is not beneficial in women older than 60 years if they have a history of negative results. The American Society of Clinical Oncology guideline has recommend for different levels of resource availability.

Pap tests have not been as effective in developing countries. This is in part because many of these countries have an impoverished health care infrastructure, too few trained and skilled professionals to obtain and interpret Pap tests, uninformed women who get lost to follow-up, and a lengthy turn-around time to get results. Visual inspection with acetic acid and HPV DNA testing have been tried, though with mixed success.

Barrier protection 
Barrier protection or spermicidal gel use during sexual intercourse decreases, but does not eliminate risk of transmitting the infection, though condoms may protect against genital warts.  They also provide protection against other sexually transmitted infections, such as HIV and Chlamydia, which are associated with greater risks of developing cervical cancer.

Vaccination 
Three HPV vaccines (Gardasil, Gardasil 9, and Cervarix) reduce the risk of cancerous or precancerous changes of the cervix and perineum by about 93% and 62%, respectively. The vaccines are between 92% and 100% effective against HPV 16 and 18 up to at least 8 years.

HPV vaccines are typically given to age 9 to 26, as the vaccine is most effective if given before infection occurs. The duration of effectiveness and whether a booster will be needed is unknown. The high cost of this vaccine has been a cause for concern. Several countries have considered (or are considering) programs to fund HPV vaccination. The American Society of Clinical Oncology guideline has recommendations for different levels of resource availability.

Since 2010, young women in Japan have been eligible to receive the cervical cancer vaccination for free. In June 2013, the Japanese Ministry of Health, Labor and Welfare mandated that, before administering the vaccine, medical institutions must inform women that the ministry does not recommend it. However, the vaccine is still available at no cost to Japanese women who choose to accept the vaccination.

Nutrition 
Vitamin A is associated with a lower risk as are vitamin B12, vitamin C, vitamin E, and beta-Carotene.

Treatment

The treatment of cervical cancer varies worldwide, largely due to access to surgeons skilled in radical pelvic surgery, and the emergence of fertility-sparing therapy in developed nations. Less advanced stages of cervical cancer typically have treatment options that allow fertility to be maintained, if the patient desires. Because cervical cancers are radiosensitive, radiation may be used in all stages where surgical options do not exist. Surgical intervention may have better outcomes than radiological approaches. In addition, chemotherapy can be used to treat cervical cancer, and has been found to be more effective than radiation alone. Evidence suggests chemoradiotherapy may increase overall survival and reduce the risk of disease recurrence compared to radiotherapy alone.  There is low-certainty evidence that peri-operative care approaches, such as 'fast-track surgery' or 'enhanced recovery programmes' may lower surgical stress and improve recovery after gynaecological cancer surgery.

Microinvasive cancer (stage IA) may be treated by hysterectomy (removal of the whole uterus including part of the vagina). For stage IA2, the lymph nodes are removed as well. Alternatives include local surgical procedures such as a loop electrical excision procedure  or cone biopsy. A systematic review concluded that more evidence is needed to inform decisions about different surgical techniques for women with cervical cancer at stage IA2.

If a cone biopsy does not produce clear margins (findings on biopsy showing that the tumor is surrounded by cancer free tissue, suggesting all of the tumor is removed), one more possible treatment option for women who want to preserve their fertility is a trachelectomy. This attempts to surgically remove the cancer while preserving the ovaries and uterus, providing for a more conservative operation than a hysterectomy. It is a viable option for those in stage I cervical cancer which has not spread; however, it is not yet considered a standard of care, as few doctors are skilled in this procedure. Even the most experienced surgeon cannot promise that a trachelectomy can be performed until after surgical microscopic examination, as the extent of the spread of cancer is unknown. If the surgeon is not able to microscopically confirm clear margins of cervical tissue once the woman is under general anesthesia in the operating room, a hysterectomy may still be needed. This can only be done during the same operation if the woman has given prior consent. Due to the possible risk of cancer spread to the lymph nodes in stage 1B cancers and some stage 1A cancers, the surgeon may also need to remove some lymph nodes from around the uterus for pathologic evaluation.

A radical trachelectomy can be performed abdominally or vaginally and opinions are conflicting as to which is better. A radical abdominal trachelectomy with lymphadenectomy usually only requires a two- to three-day hospital stay, and most women recover very quickly (about six weeks). Complications are uncommon, although women who are able to conceive after surgery are susceptible to preterm labor and possible late miscarriage. A wait of at least one year is generally recommended before attempting to become pregnant after surgery. Recurrence in the residual cervix is very rare if the cancer has been cleared with the trachelectomy. Yet, women are recommended to practice vigilant prevention and follow-up care including Pap screenings/colposcopy, with biopsies of the remaining lower uterine segment as needed (every 3–4 months for at least 5 years) to monitor for any recurrence in addition to minimizing any new exposures to HPV through safe sex practices until one is actively trying to conceive.

Early stages (IB1 and IIA less than 4 cm) can be treated with radical hysterectomy with removal of the lymph nodes or radiation therapy. Radiation therapy is given as external beam radiotherapy to the pelvis and brachytherapy (internal radiation). Women treated with surgery who have high-risk features found on pathologic examination are given radiation therapy with or without chemotherapy to reduce the risk of relapse.  A Cochrane review has found moderate-certainty evidence that radiation decreases the risk of disease progression in people with stage IB cervical cancer, when compared to no further treatment. However, little evidence was found on its effects on overall survival.

Larger early-stage tumors (IB2 and IIA more than 4 cm) may be treated with radiation therapy and cisplatin-based chemotherapy, hysterectomy (which then usually requires adjuvant radiation therapy), or cisplatin chemotherapy followed by hysterectomy. When cisplatin is present, it is thought to be the most active single agent in periodic diseases. Such addition of platinum-based chemotherapy to chemoradiation seems not only to improve survival but also reduces risk of recurrence in women with early stage cervical cancer (IA2–IIA). A Cochrane review found a lack of evidence on the benefits and harms of primary hysterectomy compared to primary chemoradiotherapy for cervical cancer in stage IB2.

Advanced-stage tumors (IIB-IVA) are treated with radiation therapy and cisplatin-based chemotherapy. On 15 June 2006, the US Food and Drug Administration approved the use of a combination of two chemotherapy drugs, hycamtin and cisplatin, for women with late-stage (IVB) cervical cancer treatment. Combination treatment has significant risk of neutropenia, anemia, and thrombocytopenia side effects.

There is insufficient evidence whether anticancer drugs after standard care help women with locally advanced cervical cancer to live longer.

For surgery to be curative, the entire cancer must be removed with no cancer found at the margins of the removed tissue on examination under a microscope. This procedure is known as exenteration.

No evidence is available to suggest that any form of follow‐up approach is better or worse in terms of prolonging survival, improving quality of life or guiding the management of problems that can arise because of the treatment and that in the case of radiotherapy treatment worsen with time. A 2019 review found no controlled trials regarding the efficacy and safety of interventions for vaginal bleeding in women with advanced cervical cancer.

Tisotumab vedotin (Tivdak) was approved for medical use in the United States in September 2021.

Prognosis

Stage
Prognosis depends on the stage of the cancer. For intraepithelial cervical neoplasmas the prognosis is good.  With treatment, the five-year relative survival rate for the earliest stage of invasive cervical cancer is 92%, and the overall (all stages combined) five-year survival rate is about 66%. These statistics may be improved when applied to women newly diagnosed, bearing in mind that these outcomes may be partly based on the state of treatment five years ago when the women studied were first diagnosed.

With treatment, 80–90% of women with stage I cancer and 60–75% of those with stage II cancer are alive 5 years after diagnosis. Survival rates decrease to 58% for women with stage III cancer and 17% or fewer of those with stage IV cancer five years after diagnosis. Recurrent cervical cancer detected at its earliest stages might be successfully treated with surgery, radiation, chemotherapy, or a combination of the three. About 35% of women with invasive cervical cancer have persistent or recurrent disease after treatment.

By country
Five year survival in the United States for White women is 69% and for Black women is 57%.

Regular screening has meant that precancerous changes and early-stage cervical cancers have been detected and treated early. Figures suggest that cervical screening is saving 5,000 lives each year in the UK by preventing cervical cancer.
About 1,000 women per year die of cervical cancer in the UK.  All of the Nordic countries have cervical cancer-screening programs in place. The Pap test was integrated into clinical practice in the Nordic countries in the 1960s.

In Africa outcomes are often worse as diagnosis is frequently at a latter stage of disease. In a scoping review of publicly-available cervical cancer prevention and control plans from African countries, plans tended to emphasize survivorship rather than early HPV diagnosis and prevention.

Epidemiology

Worldwide, cervical cancer is both the fourth-most common cause of cancer and deaths from cancer in women. In 2018, 570,000 cases of cervical cancer were estimated to have occurred, with over 300,000 deaths. It is the second-most common cause of female-specific cancer after breast cancer, accounting for around 8% of both total cancer cases and total cancer deaths in women. About 80% of cervical cancers occur in developing countries. It is the most frequently detected cancer during pregnancy, with an occurrence of 1.5 to 12 for every 100,000 pregnancies.

Australia

In 2022, it is estimated that 942 new cases of cervical cancer will be diagnosed in Australia. In 2022, it is estimated that a female has a 1 in 180 (or 0.56%) risk of being diagnosed with cervical cancer by the age of 85.

In 2020, there were 165 women aged 25–74 who died from cervical cancer, which is a mortality rate of 2 deaths per 100,000 women in the population. Over the 5 years 2016–2020, there were 62 Aboriginal and Torres Strait Islander women aged 25–74 who died from cervical cancer, which is a mortality rate of 7 deaths per 100,000 Indigenous women in the population. Over the 5 years 2016–2020, the age-standardised mortality rate among Aboriginal and Torres Strait Islander women was 3.8 times the rate of non-Indigenous Australians.

The number of women diagnosed with cervical cancer has dropped on average by 4.5% each year since organised screening began in 1991 (1991–2005). Regular twice-yearly Pap tests can reduce the incidence of cervical cancer up to 90% in Australia, and save 1,200 Australian women from dying from the disease each year.  It is predicted that because of the success of the primary HPV testing programme there will be fewer than four new cases per 100 000 women annually by 2028.

Canada 
An estimated 1,450 Canadians will be diagnosed with cervical cancer in 2022. An estimated 380 will die from it.

India 
In India, the number of people with cervical cancer is rising, but overall the age-adjusted rates are decreasing.  Usage of condoms in the female population has improved the survival of women with cancers of the cervix.

European Union 
As of 2022, the World Health Organization announced that "each year in the WHO European Region more than 66 000 women are newly diagnosed with cervical cancer and more than 30 000 die from this preventable disease. "

United Kingdom 

Cervical cancer is the 12th-most common cancer in women in the UK (around 3,100 women were diagnosed with the disease in 2011), and accounts for 1% of cancer deaths (around 920 died in 2012). With a 42% reduction from 1988 to 1997, the NHS-implemented screening programme has been highly successful, screening the highest-risk age group (25–49 years) every 3 years, and those ages 50–64 every 5 years.

United States

An estimated 13,170 new cervical cancers and 4,250 cervical cancer deaths will occur in the United States in 2019. The median age at diagnosis is 50. The rates of new cases in the United States was 7.3 per 100,000 women, based on rates from 2012 to 2016. Cervical cancer deaths decreased by approximately 74% in the last 50 years, largely due to widespread Pap test screening. The annual direct medical cost of cervical cancer prevention and treatment prior to introduction of the HPV vaccine was estimated at $6 billion.

History
 400 BCE: Hippocrates noted that cervical cancer was incurable.
 1925: Hinselmann invented the colposcope.
 1928: Papanicolaou developed the Papanicolaou technique.
 1941: Papanicolaou and Traut: Pap test screening began.
 1946: Aylesbury spatula was developed to scrape the cervix, collecting the sample for the Pap test.
 1951: First successful in-vitro cell line, HeLa, derived from biopsy of cervical cancer of Henrietta Lacks.
 1976: Harald zur Hausen and Gisam found HPV DNA in cervical cancer and genital warts; Hausen later won the Nobel Prize for his work.
 1988: Bethesda System for reporting Pap results was developed.
 2006: First HPV vaccine was approved by the FDA.
 2015: HPV Vaccine shown to protect against infection at multiple body sites.
 2018: Evidence for single-dose protection with HPV vaccine.

Epidemiologists working in the early 20th century noted that cervical cancer behaved like a sexually transmitted disease. In summary:

 Cervical cancer was noted to be common in female sex workers.
 It was rare in nuns, except for those who had been sexually active before entering the convent (Rigoni in 1841).
 It was more common in the second wives of men whose first wives had died from cervical cancer.
 It was rare in Jewish women.
 In 1935, Syverton and Berry discovered a relationship between RPV (Rabbit Papillomavirus) and skin cancer in rabbits (HPV is species-specific and therefore cannot be transmitted to rabbits).

These historical observations suggested that cervical cancer could be caused by a sexually transmitted agent. Initial research in the 1940s and 1950s attributed cervical cancer to smegma (e.g. Heins et al. 1958). During the 1960s and 1970s it was suspected that infection with herpes simplex virus was the cause of the disease. In summary, HSV was seen as a likely cause because it is known to survive in the female reproductive tract, to be transmitted sexually in a way compatible with known risk factors, such as promiscuity and low socioeconomic status. Herpes viruses were also implicated in other malignant diseases, including Burkitt's lymphoma, Nasopharyngeal carcinoma, Marek's disease and the Lucké renal adenocarcinoma. HSV was recovered from cervical tumour cells.

A description of human papillomavirus (HPV) by electron microscopy was given in 1949, and HPV-DNA was identified in 1963. It was not until the 1980s that HPV was identified in cervical cancer tissue.  It has since been demonstrated that HPV is implicated in virtually all cervical cancers. Specific viral subtypes implicated are HPV 16, 18, 31, 45 and others.

In work that was initiated in the mid-1980s, the HPV vaccine was developed, in parallel, by researchers at Georgetown University Medical Center, the University of Rochester, the University of Queensland in Australia, and the U.S. National Cancer Institute.  In 2006, the U.S. Food and Drug Administration (FDA) approved the first preventive HPV vaccine, marketed by Merck & Co. under the trade name Gardasil.

In November 2020, the World Health Organization, under backing from the World Health Assembly, set out a strategy to eliminate cervical cancer by 2050. The strategy involves vaccinating 90% of girls by the age of 15, screening 70% of women by the age of 35 and again by the age of 45, and treating 90% of women identified with cervical disease.

Society and culture

Australia
In Australia, Aboriginal women are more than five times more likely to die from cervical cancer than non-Aboriginal women, suggesting that Aboriginal women are less likely to have regular Pap tests. There are several factors that may limit indigenous women from engaging in regular cervical screening practices, including sensitivity in discussing the topic in Aboriginal communities, embarrassment, anxiety and fear about the procedure. Difficulty in accessing screening services (for example, transport difficulties) and a lack of female GPs, trained Pap test providers and trained female Aboriginal Health Workers are also issues.

The Australian Cervical Cancer Foundation (ACCF), founded in 2008, promotes 'women's health by eliminating cervical cancer and enabling treatment for women with cervical cancer and related health issues, in Australia and in developing countries.' Ian Frazer, one of the developers of the Gardasil cervical cancer vaccine, is the scientific advisor to ACCF. Janette Howard, the wife of the then-Prime Minister of Australia, John Howard, was diagnosed with cervical cancer in 1996, and first spoke publicly about the disease in 2006.

United States

A 2007 survey of American women found 40% had heard of HPV infection and less than half of those knew it causes cervical cancer. Over a longitudinal study from 1975 to 2000, it was found that people of lower socioeconomic census brackets had higher rates of late-stage cancer diagnosis and higher morbidity rates. After controlling for stage, there still existed differences in survival rates.

LGBTQ populations 
Transgender men and gender-diverse people who have a cervix (even if partially intact) or have a prior history of cervical cancer or precancerous conditions, and are age 21 or older who has ever had sex with anyone need to get screened for cervical cancer. Transmasculine people are just as likely as cisgender women to have cervical cancer, but are less likely to undergo cervical screening, because of dysphoria, gender disaffirmation or disempowerment of the individual by healthcare providers, or being misinformed of HPV and cervical cancer risks  as well as many healthcare providers perceiving transmasculine individuals to be at low risk of cervical cancer.

Transgender women who have not had bottom surgery have no risk of cervical cancer, as they do not have a cervix. Trans women who have had bottom surgery to create a vagina (vaginoplasty) and possibly a cervix, are at a very small risk to develop cancer in the tissues of their neo-vagina or neo-cervix as these tissues are made up of different cells than a cervix in a cisgender womanCervical cancer screening is not necessary in trans women who have undergone vaginoplasty because they do not have a cervix.

Intersex people with a cervix are also able to have cervical cancer.

References

Further reading

External links 

 

Gynaecological cancer
Infectious causes of cancer
Papillomavirus-associated diseases
Sexually transmitted diseases and infections
Wikipedia medicine articles ready to translate